Nick Olij (born 1 August 1995) is a Dutch professional footballer who plays as a goalkeeper for Sparta Rotterdam.

Career
He moved to NAC Breda in July 2019 upon expiry of his contract at AZ.

On 16 June 2022, Olij signed a four-year contract with Sparta Rotterdam.

Career statistics

References

External links
 
 Profile at AZ

1995 births
Living people
Dutch footballers
Association football goalkeepers
Netherlands youth international footballers
Eredivisie players
Eerste Divisie players
Koninklijke HFC players
AZ Alkmaar players
Jong AZ players
TOP Oss players
NAC Breda players
Sparta Rotterdam players
Footballers from Haarlem